Orsha is the name of several inhabited localities in Russia.

Modern localities
Urban localities
Orsha (urban-type settlement), Tver Oblast, an urban-type settlement in Kalininsky District of Tver Oblast

Rural localities
Orsha, Mari El Republic, a selo in Vyatsky Rural Okrug of Sovetsky District in the Mari El Republic; 
Orsha, Pskov Oblast, a village in Novorzhevsky District of Pskov Oblast
Orsha (rural locality), Tver Oblast, a village in Kablukovskoye Rural Settlement of Kalininsky District in Tver Oblast

Alternative names
Orsha, alternative name of Bolshaya Orsha, a village in Bolsheorshinsky Rural Okrug of Orshansky District in the Mari El Republic;